The New Orleans Saints Radio Network is a radio network which carries games of the New Orleans Saints. The flagship stations of the radio network is 870 WWL-AM and 105.3 WWL-FM in New Orleans. Many of the stations that broadcast these games are almost entirely located around the Gulf Coast region, with stations mostly located in Louisiana and Mississippi with a few exceptions.

Network Stations

Louisiana 

KZMZ 96.9 FM Alexandria
WDGL 98.1 FM Baton Rouge
WBOX 920 AM Bogalusa
WBOX-FM 92.9 FM Bogalusa
KJIN 1490 AM Houma
KJEF 1290 AM Jennings
KMDL 97.3 FM Lafayette
KPEL 1420 AM Lafayette
KNGT 99.5 FM Lake Charles
KLCL 1470 AM Lake Charles/DeRidder
KMLB 540 AM Monroe
KLIL 92.1 FM Moreauville
KQKI 95.3 FM Morgan City
WWL-FM 105.3 FM New Orleans (Flagship station)
WWL 870 AM New Orleans (Flagship station)
KRLQ 94.1 FM Ruston
KTAL 98.1 FM Shreveport/Texarkana
KVPI 92.5 FM Ville Platte

Mississippi 

WCJU 104.9 FM Columbia
WDMS 100.7 FM Greenville
WMXI 98.1 FM Hattiesburg/Laurel
WBBL 96.5 FM Richton
WJDX 620 AM Jackson
WRBE 106.9 FM Lucedale
WAZA 107.7 FM McComb
WALT-FM 102.1 FM Meridian
WQNZ 95.1 FM Natchez
WJDR 98.3 FM Prentiss

Alabama 

WNSP 105.5 FM Mobile

Florida 

WPNN 790 AM Pensacola
103.7 W279CY Pensacola (translator of WPNN 790)

Arkansas 

KWLT 102.7 FM Crossett

References 

American radio networks